vx 69 (aka vx "cheerleader" 69 or just vx, born Vincent Villalon) is a French singer who is best known as a founding member of the bands Punish Yourself, 1969 Was Fine, Le Cabaret de l'Impasse, Pinball Lizard & The Acid Kings, and 'Cheerleader 69.

Full discography

Punish Yourself
Studio albums
 1998: Feuer Tanz System
 2001: Disco Flesh: Warp 99
 2004: Sexplosive Locomotive
 2008: Gore Baby Gore
 2007: Cult Movie (CD/DVD)
 2009: Pink Panther Party
 2010: Punish Yourself VS Sonic Area : Phenomedia

Live albums
 2003: Behind The City Lights

Compilation
 2005: Crypt 1996–2002

Demos
 1994: First Demo Tape
 1995: Second Demo Tape

1969 Was Fine
Studio albums
 2009: But 666 Is Alright

Cheerleader 69
Studio albums
 2006: Godriders In The Sky

External links
 Official website

Living people
French multi-instrumentalists
French male singers
French rock singers
French singer-songwriters
Year of birth missing (living people)
Season of Mist artists
French male singer-songwriters